Swati Nanda (born Gujarat state, India) is an Indian television actress, model, and the winner of the Top Model of the World pageant of 2014. Swati appeared in Doli Armaano Ki as Sanaya Seth (Urmi's friend). She has also starred in various other TV shows, ramp shows, TV commercials, and music videos.

Swati Nanda is a software engineer by qualification, and known for being one of the tallest models in India.She is Miss india 2014

References

Living people
Year of birth missing (living people)
Indian television actresses
Female models from Gujarat